NGC 3044 is a barred spiral galaxy in the equatorial constellation of Sextans. It was discovered on December 13, 1784, by German-born English astronomer William Herschel. In 1888, Danish astronomer J. L. E. Dreyer described it as "very faint, very large, very much extended 122°". It is located at an estimated distance of  million light years. In the B band of the UBV photometric system, the galaxy spans  with the major axis aligned along a position angle of 113°. It is a relatively isolated galaxy with no nearby companions. R. B. Tully in 1988 assigned it as a member of the widely displaced Leo Cloud.

The morphological classification of NGC 3044 is SBc, indicating a barred spiral (SB) with somewhat loosely-wound spiral arms (c). The disk appears lob-sided and disturbed, suggesting a recent merger or interaction.

Designated SN 1983E, it was a suspected type II supernova that reached a peak magnitude of 14.9 (B) around March 15.

References

Further reading

Barred spiral galaxies
3044
Discoveries by William Herschel